Uozhan (Uajan) is a rural locality (a selo) in Chemalskoye Rural Settlement of Chemalsky District, the Altai Republic, Russia. The population was 77 as of 2016. There are 2 streets.

Geography 
Uozhan is located on the Chemal River, 17 km southeast of Chemal (the district's administrative centre) by road. Tolgoyek is the nearest rural locality.

References 

Rural localities in Chemalsky District